Henry atte Stone (fl. 1421) was an English politician.

He was a Member (MP) of the Parliament of England for Bletchingley in December 1421.

References

Year of birth missing
Year of death missing
English MPs December 1421